European cold wave may refer to:

2006 European cold wave
Early 2012 European cold wave
January 2017 European cold wave